The anterior scrotal arteries are branches of the deep external pudendal artery.

Function 
The anterior scrotal arteries supply part of the scrotum in men.

See also 

 Posterior scrotal arteries

References 

Arteries of the lower limb
Scrotum